Margarita Teodora Sucari Cari  is a Peruvian politician and a Congressman who represented Puno for the 2006–2011 term. Sucari belongs to the Union for Peru party.

External links
Official Congressional Site

Year of birth missing (living people)
Living people
Union for Peru politicians
Members of the Congress of the Republic of Peru
Place of birth missing (living people)
Women members of the Congress of the Republic of Peru